FWW may refer to:
 Farmer Wants a Wife, a British television series
 Fighting with Wire, an Irish rock band
 First World War, a global war fought between 1914 and 1918
 Food & Water Watch, an American consumer rights organization
 Fort Washington Way, a freeway in Cincinnati, Ohio, United States